USS Thorn has been the name of more than one United States Navy ship, and may refer to:

 USS Thorn (DD-505),  a planned destroyer; contract was cancelled, 1941
 , a destroyer in commission from 1943 to 1946
 , a destroyer in commission from 1980 to 2004

See also
 , a patrol boat in commission from 1917 to 1918

United States Navy ship names